Stravinsky is a crater on Mercury. It overlays the rim of the much older Vyāsa crater. It was named by the IAU in 1979 for the influential Russian composer Igor Stravinsky.

To the north of Stravinsky is the crater Rubens, and to the southwest is Vyāsa.

Views

References

Impact craters on Mercury